The Battle of Zitlala was a battle of the War of Mexican Independence that occurred on 26 October 1812 in the area around Escamela, Ixtaczoquitlán, Veracruz. The battle was fought between the royalist forces loyal to the Spanish crown, and the Mexican rebels fighting for independence from the Spanish Empire. The battle resulted in a victory for the Mexican rebels.

The battle
The insurgents, under the command of José María Morelos y Pavón, clashed with Spanish loyalist forces under the command of  General Luis del Águila y Andrade. The Spanish troops were made up of peninsulares and loyalists from Nueva Espana. The battle served as a precursor in the broader goal of the Capture of Orizaba later in 1812. The battle resulted in a Mexican rebel victory and an exit of royalist forces from Ixtaczoquitlán.

See also 
 Mexican War of Independence

References

Bibliography 
 

Escamela
Escamela
History of Veracruz
Escamela
Escamela
1812 in New Spain
October 1812 events